Events in the year 2022 in Togo.

Incumbents 

 President: Faure Gnassingbé
 Prime Minister: Victoire Tomegah Dogbé

Events 
Ongoing — COVID-19 pandemic in Togo

11 May - Eight soldiers are killed and 13 others are injured during an ambush by Al-Qaeda-linked militants in Kpendjal Prefecture. The attack is believed to be connected to the current insurgency in Burkina Faso, making it the first Islamic extremist attack in Togo.

21 May - An elderly Italian couple and their son are kidnapped by jihadists in Southern Mali. A Togolese citizen is also reported to have been kidnapped along with the Italians, but authorities say that they are unable to confirm if this is true.

25 June - Togo and Gabon officially become members of the Commonwealth of Nations.

9 July - Seven teenagers are killed and two others injured after government forces airstrike a village in Savanes Region Authorities say that they mistook the teenagers for jihadists.

14 July - At least 12 civilians are killed by Islamic extremist gunmen during an attack against two villages in northern Togo.

Death

References 

 
2020s in Togo
Years of the 21st century in Togo
Togo
Togo